October is the tenth month of the year.

October may also refer to:

 October (Roman month), the eighth of ten months in the oldest Roman calendar

Art
 October, a painting by French painter James Tissot

Publications
 October (journal), a journal published by the MIT Press
 October (magazine), an Egyptian Arabic political weekly
 October (novel), a 2014 novel by Zoë Wicomb
 October, by Louise Glück, 2004
 October, by Christopher Isherwood and Don Bachardy, 1982
 October, a 2017 history of the Russian Revolution, by China Miéville
 October, a 2018 zine by Jeremy Bolm
 October Island, a 1952 novel by William March

In other languages
 Octubre (magazine), a former Spanish literary magazine
 Oktyabr (magazine), a former Russian literary magazine
 Tishreen (newspaper) (Arabic: October), Syrian state controlled daily newspaper

Film and TV
 October: Ten Days That Shook the World, a 1927 film directed by Sergei Eisenstein telling the story of the 1917 October Revolution
 October (2010 film), a 2010 Peruvian film directed by brothers Daniel and Diego Vega Vidal
 October (2018 film), a 2018 Indian film directed by Shoojit Sircar

Music
 October, a 1967 symphonic poem by Dmitri Shostakovich
 "October" (Whitacre), a composition for concert band composed by Eric Whitacre

Artists and bands

Albums
 October (Claire Hamill album), by Claire Hamill
 October (soundtrack album), by Shantanu Moitra, Abhishek Arora and Anupam Roy
 October (U2 album), by U2
 October (EP), an EP by The Funeral Pyre

Songs
 "October", a song by a-ha from their 1986 album Scoundrel Days
 "October", a song by FM Static from their 2003 album  What Are You Waiting For?
 "October" (song), U2

Places
 Cape October, Severnaya Zemlya
 October Mountain, Massachusetts

Technology
 October (CMS), a content management system based on PHP and the Laravel web framework

See also
 Oktober (disambiguation)
 Oktyabr (disambiguation)